Nadendla Bhaskara Rao (born 23 June 1936) is an Indian politician who served as the Chief minister of Andhra Pradesh for a brief period in 1984. He served the shortest term yet, as the Chief Minister of Andhra Pradesh – 31 days. His son Nadendla Manohar is a former MLA from Tenali and a former Speaker in the Andhra Pradesh assembly.

Start
A lawyer by profession, he graduated from Osmania University, Hyderabad, he entered the AP state assembly in 1978. He served as a Minister of state in Chenna Reddy's cabinet.

After TDP won assembly elections in 1983, Bhaskara Rao joined NTR cabinet as Finance minister.

Short-lived CM
After one and a half years of the TDP's rule he along with his supporters pulled a coup on the NTR government in August 1984. Congress (I) gave support to Bhaskara Rao's group within TDP at a time when NTR was away in the US to undergo angiogram. Since Congress was in power at the (UTC)center and their nominee occupied the AP Governor's post, Bhaskara Rao became CM of Andhra Pradesh.

Seventeen opposition parties, including the CPI, CPI(M), BJP and the Janata criticised this move and launched a 'Save democracy movement', leading to massive anti-Centre protest against the dismissal of the TDP government. NTR returned from US, wore black clothes and launched a statewide yathra to protest the dismissal of his government. He called it a dharma yuddham (a war for justice), a war against the authoritarian and autocratic rule at the centre, for restoration of democracy and safeguarding the Constitution. The central government, recalled the governor and reinstalled NTR as CM – the only instance in political history of India when a dismissed CM was reinstated.

Bhaskara Rao left TDP and joined Congress (I) along with his close supporter Amukurajah Rao. His reign as AP CM lasted 31 days.

Post CM days

After a political hiatus, Bhaskara Rao was elected to the 12th Lok Sabha in 1998 from Khammam Constituency. He filed a defamation litigation on N.T.R: Mahanayakudu movie for showing his character negatively.

He remains active in state politics until 6 July 2019 when he joined Bharatiya Janata Party in the presence of Union Home Minister and BJP President Amit Shah.

References

External links
 Biography from 12th Lok Sabha
 "Democratic Process and Electoral Politics in Andhra Pradesh" by K.C. Suri (2002)
 
 History of TDP by G. Vasu

1936 births
Living people
Members of the Andhra Pradesh Legislative Assembly
Bharatiya Janata Party politicians from Andhra Pradesh
Chief Ministers of Andhra Pradesh
Telugu politicians
India MPs 1998–1999
Telugu Desam Party politicians
Lok Sabha members from Andhra Pradesh
People from Guntur
Osmania University alumni
Indian National Congress politicians from Andhra Pradesh
Chief ministers from Telugu Desam Party
People from Khammam district